The House Armed Services Subcommittee on Strategic Forces is a subcommittee of the House Armed Services Committee in the United States House of Representatives.

The Chair of the subcommittee is Republican Doug Lamborn of Colorado and the Ranking Member is Democrat Seth Moulton of Massachusetts.

Jurisdiction

The Strategic Forces Subcommittee exercises oversight and legislative jurisdiction over:

 Strategic Forces (except deep strike systems)
 space programs
 ballistic missile defense
 Department of Energy national security programs (except non-proliferation programs)

Members, 118th Congress

Historical membership rosters

115th Congress

116th Congress

117th Congress

Sources:

See also
 United States Senate Armed Services Subcommittee on Strategic Forces

References

External links
House Armed Services Committee 
Subcommittee page 

Armed Services Strategic Forces